Surya Narayan Yadav is a Nepalese politician, belonging to the People's Socialist Party, Nepal who was elected as the member of the 1st Federal Parliament of Nepal. In the 2017 Nepalese general election he was elected from the Saptari 1 constituency, securing 21712 (37.24%) votes.

References

Nepal MPs 2017–2022
Living people
People's Socialist Party, Nepal politicians
1958 births